The Astrologer is a 1976 American drama science-fiction film directed by and starring Craig Denney, and written by his mother, Dorothy June Pidgeon (a relation of Walter Pidgeon).

Plot 
Craig Alexander pretends to be a psychic as a hustle. When we realizes that he is actually psychic, he uses his abilities to gain money and power, to his eventual detriment.

Cast 
 Craig Denney as Alexander
 Darrien Earle as Darrien
 Rocky Barbanica as Young Alexander
 Boyd Hamlyn as Boyd
 Jacqueline Day as Rita
 Lawrence Lee as Carnival Boss with Ax
 James Moore as Carnival Assistant
 Harvey Hunter as Prison Officer
 Solomon Mathenge as African Chief
 Robert Ballagh as White Trapper in Hut
 Joe Kaye as Kenya Police Lieutenant
 Diane DiSibio as Bargirl in Tahiti
 Allene Albano as Tarot Card Reader
 Avon Adele as Alexander's Sister
 Julie Moon as Alexander's Mother
 Donald Davies as Admiral
 Arthyr Chadbourne as Arthyr Chadbourne
 Florence Marly as Diana Blair
 Mercedes Risconsin as Theatrical Agent
 Irmgard Pancritius as Palmist on TV
 Geza Palasthy as Palmist Interpreter
 Maria Palasthy as Dream Interpreter
 John Kaiser as Darrien's Lover
 Donald Kohane as Self (as Father Donald Kohane)

Production 
Often confused for a horror film released the same year with the same title, the film heavily features the use of voiceover to further the plot.

The cinematographer was Alan Gormick, Jr., "a long-time underwater camera expert lensing what would be his only full feature."

The production company was Republic Pictures.

Release 
The Astrologer was set for release on January 14, a Wednesday, and "very deliberately so. 'The astrological aspects for the picture’s release were considered,' Denney confirmed for United Press International’s Vernon Scott.  'Even though it includes some heavy knowledge about astrology.”

There are conflicting reports of whether the movie was officially released, likely due to its liberal use of copyrighted music.

The film was lost until the American Genre Film Archive recovered it in "a batch of 1,000 pornographic prints." A successful Indiegogo campaign resulted in the film being digitized. As of 2021, the film was available on The Internet Archive.

Reception 
Don Shanahan of Every Movie Has a Lesson called the film, "a treat of a trainwreck" and "one filmmaker’s passion project is another man’s vanity film."

Clint Worthington of The Spool wrote, "it can be easy to miss that feeling of discovering the diamond in the rough, that transcendently bad movie you only share with a few people you know through hushed whispers and traded bootleg tapes. Fear no more: thanks to delusional auteur Craig Denney, the diligent efforts of the American Genre Film Archive, and The AV Club and Daily Grindhouse's lineup of midnight showings at the Music Box, you can get that luster back with Denney's transcendently terrible fantasy-drama The Astrologer – a film that’s as good a case as any for the value of keeping a little bit of mystery in your moviegoing experience."

References

External links

The Astrologer at the Internet Archive

1975 films
1970s science fiction drama films
American science fiction films
1970s American films